Jessie Bayes (b. 1876  Hampstead, London - d. 1970) was a British Arts & Crafts artist who specialized in miniature paintings, illuminated manuscripts, stained glass, iconography and more.

Biography

In the earlier part of her life, Bayes did not have much technical training in the arts, but was born into a family of artists. She studied under her brother Walter Bayes, who was a well known artist and critic at the time. She was sister to Gilbert Bayes and Emmeline Bayes as well. Her father Alfred Walter Bayes, was an artist who regularly exhibited at the Royal Academy of Arts.

In 1906 she became a member of the Royal Society of Miniature Painters, Sculptors and Gravers and in 1908 exhibited at the Royal Academy. She was a part of RMS's council throughout 1925-1935. One example of her work is the stained glass windows for St. Luke's Church in Grayshott, Hampshire, England.

List of works
The Lady of Shallott - 1914
To The Night & The Cloud - 1914
Roll of Honour memorial - 1919 (Flookburgh, Cumbria)
Memorial mural to Percy and Elsie Rathbone in St Martin of Tours church, Epsom - 1927 
Font cover panels for St Andrew and St Mary's Church, Stoke Rochford (Stoke Rochford, Lincolnshire) - 1937
Memorial window to Capt. Glyn David Rhys-Williams at the Church of St. David at Miskin.
St. Luke's Church windows (Grayshott, Hampshire) - 1962

References

External links
 

1876 births
1970 deaths
19th-century English women artists
20th-century English women artists
Arts and Crafts movement artists
English stained glass artists and manufacturers
English women painters
Painters from London
People from Hampstead
Sibling artists